This is a list of the cities and woredas (districts), in the Somali Region of Ethiopia, compiled from material on the Central Statistical Agency (CSA) website.

It is unclear how many woredas actually exist in the Somali Region, since the names and number of woredas given in the CSA's documents differ between 2005 and 2007, and different maps show a variety of names and boundaries.

The subdivisions of Somali have been changed several times, often due to local clan groups claiming their own woreda, and the boundary between the Somali and Oromia Regions is disputed, leading to ambiguity over the status of border areas.

In February 2016, the DDSI parliament added two new zones (for a total of 11), new districts to each of the 9 previous zones, and several city administrations (additions marked below with ‡).

List of districts by zone

Afder Zone
Chereti Diilhara
Bare ‡
Elekere
GodGod ‡
Hargelle
Mirab Imi
 Iligdheere 
Raaso ‡
Qooxle ‡
Doollo bay
Baarey

Dhawa Zone
Dhawa Zone is new in 2016; created from Liben Zone.
Hudet ‡
[[Moyale, Somali (special woreda)‡
Lahey(zone administration)
Moyale
Mubaarak ‡
Qadhaadhumo ‡
malka mari
Ceel Goof
Ceel orba
Dheer dheertu
Ceel dheer

Dollo Zone
Boh
Danot
Daratole 
Geladin <!see also Geladi (woreda). Duplicate?-->
Gal-Hamur ‡
Lehel-Yucub ‡
Warder

Erer Zone
Erer Zone is new in 2016; created from Nogab Zone.
Fiq ‡
Lagahida ‡
Mayaa-muluqo ‡ 
Qubi ‡
Salahad ‡
Waangaay ‡
Xamaro ‡ 
Yaxoob ‡

Fafan Zone
Awbare
Babille
Goljano
Gursum
Harawo ‡ 
Haroorayso
Harshin
Jijiga (headquarters in Haroorayso) ‡
Kebri Beyah special woreda ‡
Qooraan (headquarters in Mulla) ‡
Shabeeley
Wajale special woreda ‡
Tuli Guled

Jarar Zone
Araarso
Awaare
Bilcil buur ‡
Birqod
Daroor
Degehabur Special Zone
Dhagaxmadow
Dig ‡
Gunagado 
Misraq Gashamo
Yoocaale

Korahe Zone
 Boodaley ‡
 Ceel-Ogadeen ‡
 Dobawein
 Higloley ‡
 Kebri Dahar special woreda
 Kudunbuur ‡
 Laas-dhankayre ‡
 Marsin
 Shekosh
 Shilavo

Liben Zone
Bokolmayo
Deka Softi
Dollo Ado
Filtu
Kersa Dula
Gooro bakaksa
Gurra damole

Nogob Zone
 Ayun ‡
 Duhun
 Elweyne: administrative town of Nogob zone. 
 Gerbo
 Hararey/Xaraarey ‡
 Hora-shagax ‡
 Segeg

Shabelle Zone
Abaaqoorow ‡
Adadle
Beercaano
Danan
Elele ‡
Ferfer
Gode Special Zone
Imiberi
Kelafo
Mustahil

Sitti Zone
Adigala
Afdem
Ayesha
Bike ‡
Dambal
Erer
Gablalu ‡
Mieso
Shinile

See also
Districts of Ethiopia

References

Somali
Somali Region